Robert S. Frost (September 18, 1942 - February 18, 2013) was an American composer and music educator.  He held degrees in music education, including a doctorate.  

Frost is known for his work as a string-ensemble composer who created intricate, complex arrangements.  He wrote several music theory books and was friends with conductor Dennis Hiedel.

Education
Frost received bachelor's and master's degrees in Music Education from Utah State University and his doctorate in Music Education from the University of Northern Colorado.

References

External links

 https://www.kendormusic.com/store/index.php?_a=viewCat&catId=230
 http://www.kjos.com/orchestra/frost_r.html
 http://www.cemeteryrecordsonline.com/cgi-bin/fg.cgi?page=gr&GRid=105684135

1942 births
2013 deaths
Utah State University alumni
University of Northern Colorado alumni
American male composers
American composers